Jill Savitt is an American film and TV editor known for her work on Buffy the Vampire Slayer, Secret Window, and The Lookout. She also edited episodes of Gilmore Girls, Bunheads, and Roswell.

Selected filmography 

 Mortdecai (2015)
 A Walk Among the Tombstones (2014)
 Premium Rush (2012)
 Flash of Genius (2008)
 The Lookout (2007)
 Secret Window (2004)
 Bang Bang You're Dead (2002)
 Stir of Echoes (1999)
 Telling Lies in America (1997)
 The Trigger Effect (1996)
 Blank Check (1994)
 China Moon (1994)
 Dream Lover (1993)
 Frauds (1993)
 Buffy the Vampire Slayer (1992)
 Convicts (1991)
 Full Moon in Blue Water (1988)
 Light of Day (1987)
 Key Exchange (1985)

References

External links 

 

Living people
American women film editors
Year of birth missing (living people)
American television editors
Women television editors
American film editors
21st-century American women